Hector de Monte (1575 – July 1626) was a Roman Catholic prelate who served as Bishop of Termoli (1626).

Biography
Hector de Monte was born in Lanciano, Italy in 1575. On 16 March 1626, he was appointed during the papacy of Pope Urban VIII as Bishop of Termoli. On 25 March 1626, he was consecrated bishop by Alphonse Sacrati, Bishop Emeritus of Comacchio, with Maurizio Centini, Bishop of Massa Lubrense, and Giovanni Delfino, Bishop of Belluno, serving as co-consecrators. He served as Bishop of Termoli until his death in July 1626.

References

External links and additional sources
 (Chronology of Bishops) 
 (Chronology of Bishops) 

17th-century Italian Roman Catholic bishops
Bishops appointed by Pope Urban VIII
1575 births
1626 deaths